Johnnie Ray is the debut studio album by Johnnie Ray. The album was released as a 10-inch LP and 78 rpm and 45 rpm box set and was the first album in the history of recorded music to be released with no title. The 78 rpm and 45 rpm box set of this same album simply listed "Johnnie Ray" on the spine. The album was released in 1952 on the Columbia Records label and the catalogue number was CL 6199.

Reception
In a May 3, 1952 issue of Billboard, the album was listed as the fourth best-selling 10-inch   LP in the United States.

Four months later, on September 20, 1952, the record was still in the top ten Billboard sales list, ranked the fifth-best-selling 10-inch; the week prior to that, on September 13, it had been at number 7.

Track listing

Personnel
 Johnnie Ray – vocals
 The Four Lads – vocals (5,6,7,8)
 Vincent Terri – guitar (1,2,3,4)
 Mundell Lowe – guitar (5,6,7,8)
 John Ryan – bass (1,2,3,4)
 Edward 'Eddie' Safranski – bass (5,6,7,8
 Nick Fatool – drums (1,2,3,4)
 Ed Shaughnessy – drums (5,6,7,8)
 Buddy Cole – piano (1,2,3,4)
 Stan Freeman – piano (5,6,8)
 Buddy Weed – piano (7)
 Lucky Thompson – saxophone (5,6,8)

Chart positions

Singles

Notes and references

Citations

References

External links
Jonnie Ray (1952) at AllMusic

1952 debut albums
Johnnie Ray albums
Columbia Records albums
Albums produced by Mitch Miller